The state-owned public joint stock company UkrGasVydobuvannya is the largest Ukrainian gas producer. It is a vertically integrated company with a complete production cycle: from exploration of gas and gas condensate reserves, field development, transportation, gas processing and condensate and oil refining to sales.

The company is Ukraine's largest natural gas producer, producing 70% in the country's production.

History 

UGV is a subsidiary of a state-owned National Joint-stock company "Naftogaz of Ukraine".

UGV was founded in 1998 by a merger of gas extracting divisions of SC "UkrGasProm" and some other Ukrainian gas extracting companies.

The National Anti-Corruption Bureau of Ukraine has charged (former member of the Ukrainian parliament) Oleksandr Onyshchenko as the founder and head of a criminal organization, allegedly whose members in the period from January 2013 to June 2016 stole funds during the production and sale of natural gas under joint venture agreements with UkrGasVydobuvannya.

Reforms and development 
In 2015, a new management was appointed in an open competition, which began the process of reforming the company. The Chairman of the Board since June 2015 is Prokhorenko Oleg. As part of the fight against corruption, UkrGasVydobuvannya is one of the leaders in the electronic public procurement system ProZorro.

 2016: production was stabilized and increased - +47 million m3 in 9 months; the process of modernization of its own fleet of drilling rigs has begun; the practice of outsourcing drilling services has been launched and the market for international companies was opened.
 2017: the results of this year were achieved through the implementation of an unprecedented campaign to increase natural gas production.
 2018: the results of the year were completed through the campaign to increase natural gas production at existing fields.
 2019: the successful production program was launched.
At the end of February 2019, UkrGasVydobuvannya entered into an agreement with DeGolyer and MacNaughton Corp. (USA) based on the results of the tender on the assessment of its hydrocarbon reserves, in particular, hydrocarbon reserves of 157 deposits and 49 promising areas with the distribution of priority for further development. The estimated cost is UAH 20.25 million

Company activities 

The main areas of activity of the company: prospecting and exploration of oil and gas fields, oil and gas production, transportation of oil and gas, processing of hydrocarbons, sale of oil and gas products.
In 2015, the company produced 14.5 bn m3 of gas in 2015, which accounts for 75% of total gas production in Ukraine. It increased natural gas production in 2017 by 4.8%, to 15.25 bcm. UGV also produced more than 20% of all oil and condensate in Ukraine.

In 2016, its subsidiary "Shebelinka Refinery" launched production of Euro 4 and higher standards gasoline (according to European emission standards classification) and Euro 5 Standard diesel fuel.

In April 2016, the company began producing gasoline that meets standards not lower than Euro 4.

In 2019, the company's enterprises extracted 14.892 billion m3 of gas, which is 73% of total production in Ukraine, as well as extracted more than 22% of oil and condensate in Ukraine. The volume of operational and exploratory drilling amounted to 211,6 thousand m.

Company structure 

 Drilling division “UkrBurGas”
 3 gas extraction divisions: “PoltavaGasVydobuvannya”, “ShebelynkaGasVydobuvanna” and “LvivGasVydobuvannya”
 Gas and gas condensate refining divisions (Shebelynske and Yablunivske) 
 Scientific research center “UkrNDIGas”
 Construction and assembling operations division “Ukrgasspecbudmontazh”
 Center of geophysical research “UkrGasPromGeoPhysics”
 Service company "UGV-Service”
 Specialized emergency rescue service "Likvo”
 Health center “Chervona Ruta”

Areas of extraction include Kharkiv, Poltava, Sumy, Donetsk, Lugansk, Dnipropetrovsk, Lviv, Ivano-Frankivsk, Carpathian Ruthenia and Volynska regions. Exploration activities are carried out in the Dniprovsko-Donetska cavity and the Carpathian Mountains.

According to DeGolyer estimates, as of January 1, 2019, the total reliable and probable gas reserves of JSC UkrGasVydobuvannya are 264.2 billion cubic meters. m, including reliable - 217.3 billion cubic meters and probable - 46.9 billion cubic meters. 

In 2020, UkrGasVydobuvannya restored the Abaziv deposit in Poltava region. The flow rate of the well increased from almost zero to 98 thousand m3 per day.

UGV Transformation 

The current chairman of the UGV Board Oleg Prokhorenko was appointed in June 2015 as a result of an open selection process initiated by the Government of Ukraine.

The current management team has adopted the 'Strategy 20/20' which envisages the increase of own natural gas production to 20 bn m3 in 2020. The strategy focuses on improving the economic efficiency of Company's assets, optimization of internal functions, fight against corruption and deregulation.

See also 

 Naftogaz
 Natural gas in Ukraine

External links
Naftohaz Ukrayiny – Official website
Official website of Ministry of Fuel and Energy of Ukraine
Zanuda, A. 20 years of Ukraine-Russia gas relations: want a peace – be ready for a war (20 років україно-російських газових відносин: хочеш миру – готуйся до війни). BBC Ukraine. 7 February 2013.
Lisnychuk, O., Sushko, O. Are the political-economic groups an obstacle for political development in Ukraine? (Чи є політико-економічні групи перешкодою для політичного розвитку України?). Friedrich Ebert Foundation, Regional representation in Ukraine, Belarus and Moldova. Kyiv, 2005
Yeryomenko, A. "Naftogaz Ukrayiny": Brief history in events and personalities («НАФТОГАЗ УКРАЇНИ»: КОРОТКА ІСТОРІЯ В ПОДІЯХ ТА ОСОБАХ). Mirror Weekly. 23 May 2003.
Bloomberg. Company Overview of Ukrgasvydobuvannya Public Joint Stock Company
Naftogaz group companies top the list of largest taxpayers in Ukraine
Ukrgasvydobuvannya earned additional 11 million UAH on Ukrainian Energy Exchange

References 

Oil and gas companies of Ukraine
Ministry of Energy (Ukraine)
Companies based in Kyiv
Government-owned companies of Ukraine
Naftogaz
Oil companies of Ukraine
Natural gas companies of Ukraine
Natural gas pipeline companies
Energy companies established in 1991
Non-renewable resource companies established in 1991
Ukrainian companies established in 1991
Natural resource conflicts
Ukraine
Ukrainian brands